Crawford is a locality in the South Burnett Region, Queensland, Australia.

History 
The locality takes its name from the Crawford railway station  named by Queensland Railways Department in 1904, named after engineer Hugh Ralston Crawford who supervised the construction of the Wondai-Kingaroy railway.

Logboy Provisional School opened on 22 April 1902. On 1 January 1909, it became Logboy State School. In 1911, it was renamed Crawford State School.

Crawford Methodist Church was built in 1915. It could seat 100 people and was built at a cost of £300. It is no longer extant.

Education 

Crawford State School is a government primary (Prep-6) school for boys and girls at 215-227 Siefert Street. In 2018, the school had an enrolment of 36 students with 3 teachers and 6 non-teaching staff (3 full-time equivalent).

There are no secondary schools in Crawford. The nearest government secondary school is Kingaroy State High School in neighbouring Kingaroy to the south-east.

References

External links

South Burnett Region
Localities in Queensland